The Universe was a planned artificial archipelago in the shape of the Milky Way and Solar System, to be built on the coast of Dubai, United Arab Emirates. The Universe was to be located between the Palm Jumeirah, The World, Jumeirah, and the Palm Deira. The project plan was put on hold indefinitely in 2009.

History 

The project was announced in January 2008 by the developer Nakheel, which also built the Palm Islands and The World archipelago. It was stated to be completed sometime between 2023 and 2028, but as of 2009, the project has been placed on hold. The dredging companies Van Oord and Jan de Nul planned to create up to 3,000 hectares of land.

The project was in the planning stages, but was placed on hold indefinitely in 2009. In 2009, Nakheel's website listed The Universe as a "future project". However, as of 11 April 2015 it has been removed.

See also
Tourism in Dubai

References

External links
 The Universe at Nakheel's official site

Nakheel Properties
Artificial islands of Dubai